The 2014–15 Midland Football League season was the first in the history of the new Midland Football League, a football competition in England. 

At the end of the previous season the Midland Football Alliance and the Midland Football Combination merged to form the Midland Football League. The Midland Alliance clubs formed Premier Division, while the Midland Combination clubs formed Division One.

Premier Division

The Premier Division featured 18 clubs which competed in the Midland Alliance in the previous season, along with four new clubs:

Brocton, promoted from the Midland Combination
Basford United, transferred from the Northern Counties East League
Long Eaton United, transferred from the Northern Counties East League
Lye Town, promoted from the West Midlands (Regional) League

Stadia and locations

League table

Results

Division One

Division One featured 15 clubs which competed in the Midland Combination Premier Division last season, along with five new clubs:

Cadbury Athletic, promoted from Midland Combination Division One
Heather St John's, relegated from Midland Football Alliance
Highgate United, relegated from Midland Football Alliance
Hinckley, new club
Uttoxeter Town, promoted from the Staffordshire County Senior League

League table

Results

Division Two

Division Two featured 11 clubs which competed in the Midland Combination Division One last season, along with five new clubs:

Earlswood Town, demoted from Midland Combination Premier Division 
Leicester Road, new club
Kenilworth Town, promoted from Midland Combination Division Two
Coventry United, promoted from Midland Combination Division Two
Paget Rangers, promoted from Midland Combination Division Two

League table

Division Three

Division Three featured 12 clubs which competed in the Midland Combination Division Two last season, along with three new clubs:

Redditch Borough
Smithswood Firs
Boldmere Sports & Social

League table

References

External links
 Midland Football League

2014-15
9